Thor Carl Tollefson (May 2, 1901 – December 30, 1982) was an American attorney and politician who was a U.S. representative for Washington's 6th congressional district from 1947 to 1965.

Early life and education
Born in Perley, Minnesota, Tollefson moved to Tacoma, Washington, in 1912. He attended public schools and graduated from Lincoln High School in 1924. He graduated from the University of Washington School of Law in 1930.

Career
Tollefson was admitted to the bar in 1930 and commenced practice in Tacoma. He was the prosecutor of Pierce County from 1938 to 1946. He was a delegate to the Republican State conventions in 1936, 1938, 1940, 1942 and 1944. He was elected as a Republican to the eightieth and to the eight succeeding congresses (January 3, 1947 – January 3, 1965). He represented Washington's 6th congressional district. He sat on the committee on merchant marine and fisheries. He was an unsuccessful candidate for re-election in 1964 to the eighty-eighth congress. Tollefson voted in favor of the Civil Rights Acts of 1957, 1960, and 1964, as well as the 24th Amendment to the U.S. Constitution.

Tollefson was later appointed director of the Washington Department of Fish and Wildlife. He was also a special assistant to the Governor of Washington in charge of international fisheries negotiations.

Personal life 
Tollefson was a resident of Tacoma until his death there on December 30, 1982. He was interred in Mountain View Memorial Park.

Sources

External links
Guide to the Thor C. Tollefson Papers
 University of Washington Libraries. Digital Collection

1901 births
1982 deaths
American Lutherans
American people of Norwegian descent
University of Washington School of Law alumni
Republican Party members of the United States House of Representatives from Washington (state)
20th-century American politicians
20th-century Lutherans